When Tomatoes Met Wagner is a 2019 Greek documentary film directed by Marianna Economou. It was selected as the Greek entry for the Best International Feature Film at the 92nd Academy Awards, but it was not nominated.

See also
 List of submissions to the 92nd Academy Awards for Best International Feature Film
 List of Greek submissions for the Academy Award for Best International Feature Film

References

External links
 

2019 films
2019 documentary films
Films set in Greece
Greek documentary films
2010s Greek-language films